The Office of the Chief Medical Examiner (OCME) is the agency of the government of Oklahoma (USA) responsible for investigating sudden, unexpected, violent or suspicious deaths. In this capacity, OCME provides support services to State law enforcement agencies, prosecutors, and public health officials.

Overview
The Office of the Chief Medical Examiner was created by the Oklahoma Legislature in 1961 but did not receive funding to become operational until 1967. The Chief Medical Examiner must be a licensed physician, trained and certified in forensic pathology.

Board of Medicolegal Investigations
The Board of Medicolegal Investigations is responsible for governing the operations of OCME and for setting policy which the Chief Medical Examiner executes. It is the responsibility of the Board to appoint and dismiss the Chief Medical Examiner. All members of the Board receive no compensation for their services.

The Director of the State Bureau of Investigation
The State Commissioner of Health
The Dean of the College of Medicine of the University of Oklahoma
The President or Dean of the Oklahoma State University - Center for Health Sciences
The President of the Oklahoma Bar Association
The President of the Oklahoma Osteopathic Association
The President of the Oklahoma State Medical Association
A funeral director appointed by the Oklahoma State Board of Embalmers and Funeral Directors

Administration
The Board appoints a Chief Medical Examiner, who is the chief executive of the OCME.

Powers and duties 
Under Oklahoma statute, deaths of the types listed below must be reported to the Office of the Chief Medical Examiner. The Office has the authority to further investigate for the benefit of the public health, as funding, staffing, facilities, and other regulations allow. 
 Violent deaths, whether apparently homicidal, suicidal or accidental including deaths due to thermal, chemical, electrical or radiational injury and deaths due to criminal abortions, whether self-induced or not.
 Deaths under suspicious, unusual or unnatural means.
 Deaths related to disease which might constitute a threat to public health.
 Deaths unattended by a licensed physician (D.O. or M.D.) for fatal or potentially fatal illness.
 Deaths of persons after unexplained coma.
 Deaths that are medically unexpected and that occur during a therapeutic procedure.
 Deaths of any inmate occurring in any place of penal incarceration.
 Deaths of persons whose bodies are to be cremated, buried at sea, transported out of state or otherwise made ultimately unavailable for pathological study.

Finance and staff
The Office of the Chief Medical Examiner was authorized a budget of $6.2 million for State fiscal year 2012. The Oklahoma Legislature authorized the agency to employ 77 full time equivalent positions for that period.

See also
Coroner

References

External links
Office of the Chief Medical Examiner official website

Medical examiners
1962 establishments in Oklahoma